Chanz Jeffery Green (born January 1991) is an American business owner and Republican politician from Bayfield County, Wisconsin.  He is a member of the Wisconsin State Assembly, representing Wisconsin's 74th Assembly district since January 2023.

Biography
Chanz Green was born and raised in rural northwest Wisconsin.  He graduated from Amery High School and went to work in municipal utilities in Amery, Wisconsin, and rose to become assistant director of public works in Amery.  In the meantime, he furthered his education with certificates from Northwood Technical College and University of Wisconsin–Extension programs.  

In 2019, he was hired as utilities manager for Ashland, Wisconsin, and worked on a major redesign of the city's wastewater treatment system to prevent wastewater from overflowing into Lake Superior.  Throughout these years he has also worked as a volunteer firefighter.

In 2021, he became the owner of a bar in Cable, Wisconsin, and started an event business to rent tables, chairs, and tents for outdoor events.

Political career
Due to his bar ownership, Green became involved with the Tavern League of Wisconsin, a trade association with extensive political influence in the state of Wisconsin.  In January 2022, incumbent state representative Beth Meyers announced she would not run for another term in the Assembly that Fall, creating an open seat in the 74th Assembly district.  Green announced his candidacy for the Republican nomination three months later.  He defeated electrician John Schey in the Republican primary and went on to face Democratic farmer John Adams in the general election.  The 74th Assembly district has recently featured some of the closest elections in the state, and was again one of the closest races in 2022—Green won by a margin of just 1,730 votes.  

He will take office in January 2023.

Personal life and family
Chanz Green lives with his long-term girlfriend, Katie, in the rural town of Lincoln, in Bayfield County, Wisconsin.  Green is an avid hunter and outdoorsman.  He is a member of the National Rifle Association, Wisconsin Bear Hunters Association, and Hunter Nation.

Electoral history

Wisconsin Assembly (2022)

| colspan="6" style="text-align:center;background-color: #e9e9e9;"| Republican Primary, August 9, 2022

| colspan="6" style="text-align:center;background-color: #e9e9e9;"| General Election, November 8, 2022

References

External links
 Campaign website
 
 Chanz Green at Wisconsin Vote 

1991 births
Living people
Republican Party members of the Wisconsin State Assembly 
People from Amery, Wisconsin
People from Ashland, Wisconsin
People from Bayfield County, Wisconsin
21st-century American politicians